Ecevitism is a term used for the political ideals of Bülent Ecevit, who served as the Prime Minister of the Republic of Turkey for four terms between 1974 and 2002. It is highly related to the Democratic Left Party and Left-wing nationalism.

This ideology, which was very dominant in Turkey especially in the 70s, still has many supporters today. The political side of this concept, whose ideological roots come from social democracy, is said to be the most dominant, and this ideology reached its peak with the left of center slogan when Ecevit was elected as the Chairman of the Republican People's Party in the 70s.

References 

Politics of Turkey
Eponymous political ideologies